Patrick Johnson may refer to:

Sportspeople
Patrick Johnson (wide receiver) (born 1976), former American football player
Patrick Johnson (defensive end) (born 1998), American football player
Patrick Peterson (born 1990), American football player, formerly known as Patrick Johnson
Patrick Johnson (sprinter) (born 1972), Australian sprinter

Others
Patrick Read Johnson (born 1952), American filmmaker, special effects artist and screenwriter
Patrick Johnson (actor) (born 1993), American actor
E. Patrick Johnson (born 1967), African-American performance artist, ethnographer, and scholar
 Togger Johnson (Patrick Johnson), a character in the children's TV series Grange Hill

See also
Pat Johnson (disambiguation)
Patrick Johnston (disambiguation)